What Every Woman Wants is a 1962 British comedy film directed by Ernest Morris and starring James Fox, Hy Hazell and Dennis Lotis. The screenplay concerns a marriage guidance counsellor who struggles with his own domestic life.

Premise
In this marital comedy, married mother Jean Goodwin (Hy Hazell) and her daughter Sue (Elizabeth Shepherd) team up to reform their husbands, to get them to pay more attention to them. Their elaborate plan causes comic mayhem.

Cast
 James Fox as Philip Goodwin
 Hy Hazell as Jean Goodwin
 Dennis Lotis as Tom Yardley
 Elizabeth Shepherd as Sue Goodwin
 Guy Middleton as George Barker
 Andrew Faulds as Derek Chadwick
 Patsy Smart as Hilda
 Ian Fleming as Nelson
 George Merritt as Maxwell
 Brian Peck as Barman
 Vi Stevens as Mrs Adams
 George Roderick as Adams
 John Breslin as John Shand
 Jack Melford as Doctor Falcon

Critical reception
TV Guide gave the film two out of four stars, calling it a "Surprisingly amusing family-oriented comedy."

References

External links

1962 films
1962 comedy films
Films directed by Ernest Morris
British comedy films
Films set in London
Films about journalism
United Artists films
Films about the mass media in the United Kingdom
1960s English-language films
1960s British films